Sara Errani was the defending champion, but chose to compete in Dubai instead.

Francesca Schiavone won the title, defeating Shelby Rogers in the final, 2–6, 6–2, 6–2.

Seeds

Draw

Finals

Top half

Bottom half

Qualifying

Seeds

Qualifiers

Draw

First qualifier

Second qualifier

Third qualifier

Fourth qualifier

Fifth qualifier

Sixth qualifier

References 
 Main draw
 Qualifying draw

Rio Open - Women's Singles
Rio
Rio Open